All Is Quiet Now is the second studio album by Belgian band Arid. It was released in 2002 by Epic Records, an imprint of Sony BMG.

Track listing
All tracks written by David Du Pré and Jasper Steverlinck, except "I Wish I Was All Of That", composed by Du Pré, Steverlinck and Filip Ros.
"All I Did (Was Get Close To You)" – 3:26
"You Are" – 3:24
"Silent Reproach" – 4:11
"The Body Of You" – 3:57
"Everlasting Change" – 3:02
"Wintertime" – 3:54
"I Wonder How Come" – 3:54
"Move Your Head" – 3:18
"I Wish I Was All Of That" – 3:26
"Million Lights" – 3:35

Charts

Weekly charts

Year-end charts

References

2002 albums
Arid (band) albums
Epic Records albums